Shuryshkarsky District (Khanty: Ӆорвош район, Łorvoš rajon) is an administrative and municipal district (raion), one of the seven in Yamalo-Nenets Autonomous Okrug of Tyumen Oblast, Russia. It is located in the southwest of the autonomous okrug. Its administrative center is the rural locality (a selo) of Muzhi. Population: 9,814 (2010 Census);  The population of Muzhi accounts for 36.8% of the district's total population.

Geography
Mount Payer, part of the Polar Urals and the highest point of the okrug, is located in the district.

References

Notes

Sources

Districts of Yamalo-Nenets Autonomous Okrug